Pasquini is an Italian surname. Notable people with the surname include:

 Bernardo Pasquini (1637–1710), Italian Baroque composer
 Bruno Pasquini (1914–1995), Italian racing cyclist
 Domenico Pasquini (1740–1798), Italian painter
 Ercole Pasquini (c.1560–1608 or 1619), Italian composer and organist
 Federico Pasquini (born 1973), Italian professional basketball coach and general manager
 Francesca Pasquini (born 1981), Italian-born French politician
 Giovanni Claudio Pasquini (1695–1763), Italian poet and librettist
 José María Pasquini Durán (1939–2010), Argentine journalist, writer, teacher and political analyst
 Pierre Pasquini (1921-2006), French politician
 Nicolás Pasquini (born 1991), Argentine professional footballer
 Riccardo Pasquini (1849-1937), Italian painter
 Stefano Pasquini (born 1969), Italian artist and writer
 Dave Rodgers (born Giancarlo Pasquini, 1963), Italian songwriter, composer, and producer

Italian-language surnames
Surnames of Italian origin